31st BSFC Awards
December 12, 2010

Best Film: 
The Social Network

The 31st Boston Society of Film Critics Awards, honoring the best in filmmaking in 2010, were given on December 12, 2010.

Winners

Best Film:
The Social Network
Runner-up: Toy Story 3
Best Actor:
Jesse Eisenberg – The Social Network
Runner-up: Colin Firth – The King's Speech
Best Actress:
Natalie Portman – Black Swan
Runner-up: Annette Bening – The Kids Are All Right
Best Supporting Actor:
Christian Bale – The Fighter
Runner-up: Andrew Garfield – The Social Network
Best Supporting Actress:
Juliette Lewis – Conviction
Runner-up: Melissa Leo – The Fighter
Best Director:
David Fincher – The Social Network
Runner-up: Darren Aronofsky – Black Swan
Best Screenplay:
Aaron Sorkin – The Social Network
Runner-up: Nicole Holofcener – Please Give
Best Cinematography:
Roger Deakins – True Grit
Runner-up: Matthew Libatique – Black Swan
Best Documentary:
Marwencol
Runner-up: Inside Job
Best Foreign-Language Film:
Mother (Madeo) • South Korea
Runner-up: I Am Love (Io sono l'amore) • Italy
Best Animated Film:
Toy Story 3
Runner-up: The Illusionist (L'illusionniste)
Best Editing:
Andrew Weisblum – Black Swan
Runner-up: Lee Smith – Inception
Best New Filmmaker:
Jeff Malmberg – Marwencol
Runner-up: David Michôd – Animal Kingdom
Best Ensemble Cast:
The Fighter
Runner-up: The Kids Are All Right
Best Use of Music in a Film:
Trent Reznor and Atticus Ross – The Social Network
Runner-up: Carter Burwell – True Grit

External links
 2010 Winners

References
 “The Social Network” Leads Boston Critics Awards IndieWire
 ‘Social Network’ is tops with Boston Society of Film Critics Boston Globe

2010
2010 film awards
2010 awards in the United States
2010 in Boston
December 2010 events in the United States